The Grout Museum District – named after Henry W. Grout – is a set of museums in Waterloo, Iowa. The District consist of the Grout Museum of History & Science, Bluedorn Science Imaginarium, Rensselaer Russell House Museum, Snowden House and the Sullivan Brothers Iowa Veterans Museum.

General history 
The museum started with the private collection and endowment of Henry W. Grout, a Waterloo financier and legislator. The original Henry W. Grout Historical Museum was dedicated in October 1934.

The district is a nonprofit educational entity and is accredited by the American Alliance of Museums.

Grout Museum of History & Science 
By the time of his death, Grout had collected over 2,000 objects. He had established an endowment and named trustees to care for his collection, which was displayed for many years at the local YMCA (now the River Plaza building on 4th Street). The current building (503 South Street) was completed in 1956 and opened to the public as a not-for-profit museum.

Rensselaer Russell House Museum 
The Rensselaer Russell House Museum is listed on the National Register of Historic Places and is one of the oldest homes in Black Hawk County. Guided tours are available.

Picture Gallery

References

External links 
 Grout Museum District web site

Museums established in 1934
History museums in Iowa
Science museums in Iowa
Historic house museums in Iowa
Museums in Black Hawk County, Iowa
1934 establishments in Iowa
Military and war museums in Iowa
Buildings and structures in Waterloo, Iowa